Cap Fréhel is a peninsula in Côtes-d'Armor, in northern Brittany, France which extends off the Côte d'Émeraude into the Golfe de Saint-Malo. No towns or villages are situated on the peninsula; however, two lighthouses, one from the 17th century and the other one from 1950, are located at the tip of it. The Cap is located 8.5 km from the town centre of Fréhel, although, administratively, it is located within the territory of the commune of Plévenon.

The peninsula is surrounded mainly by cliffs, which make it difficult to access it via sea. The whole of the undulating terrain is covered in moorland and marshes, which make it difficult to construct any structure on the site.

Cap Fréhel gives its name to Cape Freels when sailors from Newfoundland begin to fish Atlantic cod.

It is also the finish of Stage 5 of the 2011 Tour de France.

French actress and singer Fréhel had taken her stage name from this peninsula.

Frehel, Cap
Frehel, Cap
Headlands of Brittany
Tourist attractions in Côtes-d'Armor